CSS Wilmington was an unnamed casemate ironclad built for the Confederate States Navy during the American Civil War. The ship was never officially named and is referred to by historians by the name of the city in which she was built. Wilmington was still under construction during the February 1865 Battle of Wilmington and was destroyed to prevent her capture by Union troops after their victory.

Background and description

Wilmington was designed by the Chief Naval Constructor, John L. Porter, as a replacement for the rotten ironclad CSS North Carolina and the wrecked ironclad CSS Raleigh for the defenses of the Cape Fear River in North Carolina in 1864. Unlike those ships, Wilmington may have been designed to force engagements on the Union blockaders as her sleek lines and powerful propulsion machinery suggest something more than a defensive role.

The ship was fitted with two small pilot houses, one each fore and aft of the casemates, that were shaped like truncated pyramids.

She was powered by a pair of high-pressure horizontal single-cylinder direct-acting steam engines that had a  bore and a  stroke. Each engine drove an  propeller via  and  gears, using steam provided by four tubular boilers. The propellers were connected by an idler shaft which prevented them from rotating at different speeds, which would have significantly inhibited the ship's maneuverability. All of the propulsion machinery was built by the Columbus Naval Iron Works in Columbus, Georgia, but had not been delivered before Wilmington was destroyed.

The ship's main battery consisted of two guns of an unknown type on pivot mounts, each of which was housed in a small octagonal casemate. 
Each casemate had seven gun ports. The thickness of Wilmingtons wrought-iron armor is unknown.

Construction and fate
Porter visited Wilmington at the direction of Stephen Mallory, the Confederate States Secretary of the Navy, in late May 1864 after the first two ironclads built at Wilmington were lost or became ineffective; Raleigh was run aground and was wrecked on the sandbar at the mouth of the Cape Fear River on 7 May and North Carolina due to the green wood of her hull rotting and attacks by shipworms. Porter produced his design for Wilmington shortly afterwards and the ship was laid down at the Berry Brothers shipyard on Eagles Island across the river from the city. Although she reportedly used armor salvaged from the two earlier ironclads, Wilmington was still on the stocks when the Union captured the city on 22 February 1865. She was burned by the retreating Confederate troops to prevent her capture.

Citations

Bibliography

Further reading
 

North Carolina in the American Civil War
Ships built in Wilmington, North Carolina